The 2010 Paris–Nice was the 68th running of the Paris–Nice cycling stage race, often known as the Race to the Sun. It started on 7 March and ended on 14 March in Nice and consisted of a prologue time-trial and seven stages. Alberto Contador of Spain won the race, regaining the title he had won in 2007. Alejandro Valverde finished second, but his results during 2010 were expunged as part of the terms of his suspension for involvement in the 2006 Operación Puerto doping case,

Teams competing

22 teams were invited to the 2010 Paris–Nice, including 16 of the 18 ProTour teams, and both teams that had lost that status at the end of the preceding season. The teams were:

Stages

Prologue
7 March 2010 – Montfort-l'Amaury, individual time trial (ITT)

The course for the prologue time trial was a relatively simple  out-and-back ride through Montfort-l'Amaury. It was almost entirely flat, with one small categorized climb, to award the first polka dot jersey, coming after . The course was not very technical, as it contained just two sharp turns.

Lars Boom and Peter Sagan, both former cyclo-cross specialists, posted strong times early in the day, with Boom 10 seconds the better of the two. Expecting to be beaten, Boom watched overall contenders like Levi Leipheimer, Alberto Contador, and defending champion Luis León Sánchez all fall short, giving the young Dutchman the win. Boom later said his cyclo-cross experience helped him, as the course covered several different types of terrain. The win gave Boom all four jerseys on the first podium – in his stead, Jens Voigt wore the green points jersey, Sagan the white youth classification jersey, and Alejandro Valverde the polka dot jersey for the mountains classification lead.

Prologue results and General Classification after the Prologue

Stage 1
8 March 2010 – Saint-Arnoult-en-Yvelines to Contres, 

The first road race stage was a perfectly flat ride from Saint-Arnoult-en-Yvelines to Contres, heading due south.

What had the makings of a straightforward day of racing changed drastically in the final , as strong crosswinds blasted the peloton. Many riders crashed, including Heinrich Haussler, Levi Leipheimer and Alberto Contador, with Contador's crash serious enough to leave him wondering if he could continue the race.

The principal breakaway of the day involved Philippe Gilbert and Tom Veelers. They broke away  into the stage. Euskaltel–Euskadi had tried to place a rider in this breakaway attempt, but their team leader Samuel Sánchez had, incidentally, crashed moments earlier, meaning the squad had to rally around him. Gilbert and Veelers stood little chance of staying away for the stage win on such a flat course, and were caught  from the finish line. After other ultimately inconsequential breakaway attempts that occurred after the catch, most of the peloton was together at the  mark, when the strong winds started to blow. The winds, combined with a timely attack, made it so 15 riders gained 17 seconds on the rest of the field. Race leader Lars Boom was in this breakaway, as were overall contenders Luis León Sánchez and Alejandro Valverde. Contador and Leipheimer both missed the selection because of their crashes. Team Sky's Greg Henderson was easily the strongest sprinter in the selective final break, and took the stage win. Boom retained all four jerseys on the stage 1 podium, with Kreuziger assuming the white jersey in his stead and Voigt and Valverde continuing to wear the green and polka dot jerseys.

Stage 1 result

General Classification after Stage 1

Stage 2
9 March 2010 – Contres to Limoges, 

Stage 2 was mostly flat, but it included three third-category climbs, including the Côte de Maison Neuve at the  mark, which had an average gradient of over 6%.

Another early breakaway took place on this stage, with the Dutch teams Vacansoleil and Skil–Shimano trying to prove their combativeness to the ASO to potentially get wildcard entries to the upcoming Tour de France. Vacansoleil's Jens Mouris and Skil–Shimano's Koen de Kort were joined by Liquigas-Doimo rider Mauro Finetto and Saur-Sojasun's Laurent Mangel. Their escape, which took form just  into the stage. Their maximum advantage on the Caisse d'Epargned-led peloton was 4'15", and they were easily caught with  left to race. Mangel was first over the first two climbs on the day, and took over possession of the polka dot jersey from race leader Lars Boom after the stage. Several teams tried to set up the sprint finish, but in the chaos a crash took place  from the line, thinning the possibilities for stage winner (though all who crashed were awarded the same time as the stage winner). Peter Sagan was in first position on the road in sight of the finish line, but he was overhauled by Bbox Bouygues Telecom rider William Bonnet, giving that team its first win of the season on European soil. Boom retained the race leadership and the white jersey for the youth classification, and Kreuziger again wore the white jersey in his place. Luis León Sánchez, third on the stage, took ownership of the green jersey for the points classification.

Stage 2 result

General Classification after Stage 2

Stage 3
10 March 2010 – Saint-Junien to Aurillac, 

This course, as originally designed, was undulating, with six categorized climbs. The first half contained three third-category climbs, all with gradients lesser than 6%. A quick  stretch of descending followed the Côte de la Martinie before the finish line.

Therefore, the first two categorized climbs (category 3) were left out of the stage.

Three riders broke away  into the stage. Once again, a  rider was among them, on this day Yann Huguet. Jürgen Roelandts and Nikolas Maes joined him, and they built a seven-minute advantage by the  mark. The gap slowly fell from that point, and after Huguet and Roelandts dropped Maes they were caught with  left. Six riders counterattacked on the way up the Côte de la Martinie, with Nicolas Roche and Peter Sagan instigating the move.  reacted quickly, with André Greipel pacing Tony Martin into the break. They were also joined by Jens Voigt, Joaquim Rodríguez, and Alberto Contador. Voigt assumed the overall race leadership. Sagan took both the green and white jerseys on the podium after the stage; his teammate Roman Kreuziger wore the white jersey in the next stage.

Stage 3 result

General Classification after Stage 3

Stage 4
11 March 2010 – Maurs to Mende, 

Stage 4 had many time gaps, as it included two difficult climbs in the final . The second-category Côte de Chabrits, at 6.8% grade, crested at that point. Following a quick descent, the final  of the stage were spent on the first-category Côte de la Croix Neuve climb in Mende, with a steady 10.7% grade.

Their advantage on the peloton hovered between three and four minutes for most of the stage, until  took to pacing the main field to start to bring them back. The catch occurred  from the finish line.

After other riders tried their luck and were brought back, Alberto Contador put in an attack that no one could answer, netting him the stage win. The field finished scattered behind him, and when overnight race leader Jens Voigt finished 44 seconds back, Contador also became the new race leader.

Stage 4 result

General Classification after Stage 4

Stage 5
12 March 2010 – Pernes-les-Fontaines to Aix-en-Provence, 

The fifth stage was again undulating. There were four categorized climbs on course, with the last occurring  from the finish line, and an uncategorized "wall" just before the stage ended.

In heavy contrast to the previous days of racing, stage five began with sunshine and warm temperatures. This group's maximum advantage was 1' 20", meaning Taaramäe was briefly race leader on the road, as he started the stage 1' 06" down to Alberto Contador. Taaramäe took maximum mountains points on the last two climbs, protecting teammate Amaël Moinard's newly-taken lead in the mountains classification. With  remaining, after the catch occurred,  set a blistering pace at the front of the main field, trying to set up Nicolas Roche for a sprint win. The pace fractured the peloton, with Levi Leipheimer and Thomas Voeckler notables among a large group that lost 2' 36" at the finish line.

With  left to go, Peter Sagan put in an "audacious" attack that won the young Slovak his second stage in three days. Top general classification contenders like Alejandro Valverde and Contador finished together 2 seconds behind Sagan, as they were unable to overtake Sagan on the road. Contador referred to the day as "a terrible stage", as no team seemed able to take control of the chaotic day of racing.

Stage 5 result

General Classification after Stage 5

Stage 6
13 March 2010 – Peynier to Tourrettes-sur-Loup, 

Stage six was the queen stage, with eight categorized climbs on the road. The last was the first-category Col de Vence, which had a 6.6% grade, steady for the  the climb took. A steep descent and a small raise to the finish line followed.

Some big-name riders made the escape on this stage. A group of 23 formed early on, including Levi Leipheimer, Damiano Cunego, and Sylvain Chavanel. Mountains classification leader Amaël Moinard was also in the break, and took top points on five of the stage's climbs to give himself an unassailable lead in those standings. When the advantage of this group reached two minutes, the overall race lead of Alberto Contador was threatened by Chavanel. On the ascent of the Col de Vence, the only riders remaining from the break were Xavier Tondó, Alexandr Kolobnev, Cyril Gautier, Chavanel, and Cunego. Various attacks and splits out of the peloton eventually absorbed all but Tondó, who soloed to the finish line with a 5-second advantage over the main field, led home by Alejandro Valverde. Only time bonuses won by Valverde and Peter Sagan caused the overall standings to change.

Stage 6 result

General Classification after Stage 6

Stage 7
14 March 2010 – Nice, 

The final stage was short, but it was far from ceremonial, containing three first-category climbs. It started and ended, after a loop, in Nice. The Col de la Porte was probably the most difficult climb in the race, reaching  in elevation on a 7.2% grade. After that peak, the riders descended almost to sea level again before scaling La Turbie, which was less steep but a longer climb. The Col d'Eze was the final climb of the Race to the Sun, after which the peloton descended all the way to sea level before finishing the race.

The peloton stayed together through the first hour of this stage. When Peter Sagan won the first intermediate sprint, at the  mark, he secured his victory in the points classification over Jens Voigt and Alejandro Valverde. On the ascent of the Col de la Porte, Thomas Voeckler and mountains classification leader Amaël Moinard slipped away and built up a two-minute gap. The chase began in earnest early on such a short stage, but because of the mountainous parcours the two still had a lead of 30 seconds on the descent of the Col d'Eze. Moinard took 28 of 30 possible mountains classification points on the day despite already having an unassailable lead in the classification. In defense of his yellow jersey, Alberto Contador went on the attack to try to reel in Moinard and Voeckler on the ascent of the Col d'Eze, taking with him Luis León Sánchez, Valvede, Rein Taaramäe, and Joaquim Rodríguez. Rodríguez was the aggressor from this group on the climb, gapping them for a time, though he was unable to bridge to the leaders. Samuel Sánchez and Tiago Machado bridged from the peloton to the Contador group, and Machado and Valverde also gapped them, putting in a clear threat to Contador. Contador himself was forced to tap out a pace that brought them back.

While Moinard and Voeckler were in view of the Contador group in the final kilometer, they were able to stay away to the finish line. Voeckler thought the group was closer to them than they actually were, and started his sprint for the finish line very early. Moinard easily held his wheel until the final few meters, and came around him for the victory. Valverde claimed bonus seconds for third on the stage, but it was not enough to force Contador from the top step of the final podium.

Stage 7 result

Final General Classification

Classification leadership progress

Final standings

Final General Classification
All riders from second place downward promoted by one position due to the retroactive suspension of Alejandro Valverde

Points Classification
Points earned by Alejandro Valverde are subject to removal, and so ranking is subject to revision.

Mountains Classification
Points earned by Alejandro Valverde are subject to removal, and so ranking is subject to revision.

References

External links
Official Website of 2010 Paris-Nice (French) 

Paris–Nice
Paris-Nice
Paris-Nice
Paris-Nice